Ángel Javier García Correale (born March 26, 1986) is a Uruguayan rower. He competed for the 2008 Summer Olympics in Beijing, where he and his partner Rodolfo Collazo finished third for the C-final, and fifteenth overall in the men's lightweight double sculls, with a time of 6:30.61.

References

External links

NBC Olympics Profile

Uruguayan male rowers
Living people
Olympic rowers of Uruguay
Rowers at the 2008 Summer Olympics
Sportspeople from Montevideo
1986 births
21st-century Uruguayan people